Jahdai is a biblical figure that according to 1 Chron 2:47, is either a concubine or a descendant of Caleb. The text is ambiguous on the matter. 1 Chronicles 2:46-48 (Young's Literal Translation) reads: 46And Ephah concubine of Caleb bare Haran, and Moza, and Gazez; and Haran begat Gazez.
47And sons of Jahdai: Regem, and Jotham, and Geshem, and Pelet, and Ephah, and Shaaph.
48The concubine of Caleb, Maachah, bare Sheber and Tirhanah

External links
 NETBible

Books of Chronicles people